Richard Tomberg (6 September 1897 Mõisamaa, Salla Parish – 25 May 1982 Tallinn) was an Estonian military Major General. He was the only Estonian higher military personnel, who survived Soviet times in 1940s.

In 1915 he entered voluntarily into Czarist Army. In 1916 he graduated from Vilnius Military School. He participated on World War I in the Imperial Russian Army. In 1917 he joined with Estonian national regiments. He participated in the Estonian War of Independence. 1928-1930 he was the chief of staff of Estonian Air Force. 1930-1940 he was the chief of Estonian Air Force.

In 1940 he transferred to Soviet Army. In 1944, he was arrested by the NKVD, but in 1956 he was released and rehabilitated and retired.

Awards 
 1938: Order of the Cross of the Eagle, II Class.

References 

1897 births
1982 deaths
20th-century Estonian military personnel
Estonian military personnel of World War I
Estonian military personnel of the Estonian War of Independence
Recipients of the Military Order of the Cross of the Eagle, Class II
Gulag detainees
Prisoners and detainees of the Soviet Union
People from Väike-Maarja Parish